Yunus Emre Dede is a Turkish freestyle wrestler, competing in the 97 kg division. He is a bronze medalist at the 2018 Mediterranean Games.

Career 

In 2015, he won the bronze medal in the men's freestyle 120 kg event at the 2015 World Juniors Wrestling Championships held in Salvador da Bahia, Brazil.

Yunus Emre Dede captured bronze medal in men's freestyle 97 kg at 2018 Mediterranean Games.

References

External links 
 

Living people
Place of birth missing (living people)
Turkish male sport wrestlers
Mediterranean Games medalists in wrestling
1995 births
20th-century Turkish people
21st-century Turkish people